Istiblennius rivulatus is a species of combtooth blenny found on coral reefs in the western Indian ocean.

References

rivulatus
Fish described in 1830